The Bishop of East Anglia is the Ordinary of the modern Roman Catholic Diocese of East Anglia in the Province of Westminster, England.

The incumbent is Bishop Peter Collins, who was installed on 14 December 2022. His appoinment was announced on 11 October 2022, the same day that his predecessor, Bishop Alan Hopes, retired. Hopes was appointed Apostolic Administrator to oversee the diocese until the installation of his successor.

History
Prior to this the area came under the jurisdiction of the Diocese of Northampton. The Episcopal see is in the city of Norwich where the bishop's seat is located at the Cathedral Church of St John the Baptist.

List of the Bishops of East Anglia

References

External links
Official website of the Diocese of East Anglia

 
Roman Catholic Diocese of East Anglia